A phylarch is a Greek title meaning "ruler of a tribe", from phyle, "tribe" + archein "to rule".

In Classical Athens, a phylarch was the elected commander of the cavalry provided by each of the city's ten tribes.

In the later Roman Empire of the 4th to 7th centuries, the title was given to the leading princes of the Empire's Arab allies in the East (essentially the equivalent to "sheikh"), both those settled within the Empire and outside. From ca. 530 to ca. 585, the individual phylarchs were subordinated to a supreme phylarch from the Ghassanid dynasty. In Thomas More's Utopia (1516), leaders of Utopian cities are called phylarchs.

References

Ancient Athenian titles
Byzantine titles and offices
Greek words and phrases